Naxoo is a Swiss cable television company owned by 022 Télégenève. The Company also provides broadband internet and telephone services in Switzerland.

Launched in Geneva in 1986, Naxoo offers a mixture of Swiss and foreign TV channels, both analog and digital, as well as radio channels (arte, 3sat, Euronews, TV5Monde, ARD, ORF eins, France 2, Rai 1 as required by law).

External links 
 Official Site 
 Channel line-up 
 Official TV Guide (use tvtv Services) 

Television in Switzerland
Cable television companies
Communications in Switzerland
Mass media companies established in 1986
Telecommunications companies established in 1986
Swiss companies established in 1986
Mass media in Geneva